The women's 200 metres at the 2008 Summer Olympics took place on 19–21 August (final) at the Beijing National Stadium.

Allyson Felix, the young American athlete and already a double World champion, entered the 200m race in Beijing as a favorite for the gold. Defending champion Veronica Campbell-Brown of Jamaica also appeared to be in great form, setting a new personal best of 21.94 seconds at the Olympic trials.

In the final, Campbell-Brown had the quickest start and made up the stagger very quickly on Allyson Felix, who had been drawn in the lane outside of her. Running a stellar curve and accelerating out of the bend, the Jamaican athlete held her form to cross the line in 21.74 seconds, the fastest time of the decade and a new personal best.

Veronica Campbell-Brown, who suffered from injuries that led to disappointment in the 200m in the 2007 World Championships, returned to form to become only the second woman in history to win back-to-back Olympic 200m titles. Allyson Felix was once again relegated to the silver medal in a seasonal best of 21.93, the second-fastest time of her career. Jamaican Kerron Stewart won the bronze medal by just a hundredth of a second.

The qualifying standards were 23.00 s (A standard) and 23.20 s (B standard).

Records
Prior to this competition, the existing world and Olympic records were as follows:

No new world or Olympic records were set for this event.

Results

Round 1
Qualification: First 4 in each heat (Q) and the next 8 fastest (q) advance to the Round 2.

Round 2
Qualification: First 3 in each heat (Q) and the next 4 fastest (q) advance to the Semifinals.

Semifinals
Qualification:  First 4 in each heat (Q) advance to the Final.

Semifinal 1
20 August 2008 - 21:55 Wind: 0.0 m/s

Semifinal 2
20 August 2008 - 22:04 Wind: -0.2 m/s

Final

21 August 2008 - Wind: 0.6 m/s

References

Athletics at the 2008 Summer Olympics
200 metres at the Olympics
2008 in women's athletics
Women's events at the 2008 Summer Olympics